The following is a list of pipeline accidents in the United States in 2015. It is one of several lists of U.S. pipeline accidents. See also list of natural gas and oil production accidents in the United States.

Incidents 

This is not a complete list of all pipeline accidents. For natural gas alone, the Pipeline and Hazardous Materials Safety Administration (PHMSA), a United States Department of Transportation agency, has collected data on more than 3,200 accidents deemed serious or significant since 1987.

A "significant incident" results in any of the following consequences:
 fatality or injury requiring in-patient hospitalization
 $50,000 or more in total costs, measured in 1984 dollars
 liquid releases of five or more barrels (42 US gal/barrel)
 releases resulting in an unintentional fire or explosion

PHMSA and the National Transportation Safety Board (NTSB) post incident data and results of investigations into accidents involving pipelines that carry a variety of products, including natural gas, oil, diesel fuel, gasoline, kerosene, jet fuel, carbon dioxide, and other substances. Occasionally pipelines are repurposed to carry different products.

 On January 14, a fire broke out at an oil pipeline pump station, in Texas City, Texas. Texas City fire officials said that company officials reported that there had been issues with the pump station over the weekend. There were no injuries.
 On January 14, during work to free a trapped inline inspection unit, a leak was discovered on the Evangeline Pipeline, near Cameron Parish, Louisiana. This pipeline had been given a Corrective Action Order in October 2014, due to a number of leaks.
 Also on January 14, a gas pipeline exploded near the Ross Barnett Reservoir in Brandon, Mississippi, creating a sizable crater in the ground and burning 6 acres of vegetation before the fire was extinguished. No injuries were reported. The failure was due to a "hard spot" from manufacturing, that already had a repair sleeve on it. There are 788 sleeves on the Index 129 pipeline from Edna, Texas, to Sterlington, Louisiana; and, 726 sleeves on the Index 130 pipeline from Marchand Junction, Louisiana to Kosciusko, Mississippi. Both were built from pipe made in 1952.
 On January 16, a transmission pipeline operated by Kinder Morgan subsidiary Southern Natural Gas had an equipment malfunction in Walthall County, Mississippi. The cause was cold weather; ice build-up caused a regulator to malfunction.
 On January 17, oil from a broken pipeline seeped into the Yellowstone River, and contaminated the water supply 10 miles south of Glendive, Montana. The release was from Bridger Pipeline LLC's 12-inch Poplar line, which can carry 42,000 barrels a day of crude from the Bakken Formation and runs from Canada south to Baker, Montana. Bridger Pipeline is a subsidiary of True Cos., a privately held Wyoming-based company. The company said in a statement that the pipeline was shut down within an hour of the leak. About 30,000 gallons of crude were spilled, with about 28,000 gallons of crude being lost.
 On January 21, a petroleum products pipeline in Honolulu, Hawaii ruptured, due to external corrosion, spilling about 42,000 gallons of petroleum product, of which about 22,000 gallons was lost.
 On January 21, a crude oil pipeline pump station caught fire northwest of Texas City, Texas. Texas City fire officials said that company officials reported that there had been issues with the pump station over the weekend.
 On January 26, a 20-inch Enterprise Products ATEX pipeline carrying ethane exploded and burned, in Brooke County, West Virginia. Despite snow in the area, five acres of woodlands burned, and 1,283,000 gallons of ethane were consumed, or lost. The fireball melted siding on nearby homes and damaged power lines; it is believed that day’s snowy weather lessened the damage. Reports suspect a girth weld failure from ductile tensile overload, with the pipeline being less than two years old. Survey showed that the pipeline had slumped three feet since being built. A geotechnical survey conducted by Pennsylvania Soil and Rock determined that the failed pipe was installed across a transition area or "head wall" of an old underground mine and surface strip mine. There were no injuries.
 On January 29, near Bowling Green, Missouri, a rupture in a Rockies Express 42-inch-diameter natural gas pipeline blew a 20 by 20-foot crater and forced a six-hour evacuation of 50 families. The rupture occurred in a vacant field a few yards east of Pike County Road 43. Strong winds dissipated gas until a temporary cap was put in place. This explosion did $2,672,345 in property damage and was caused by a faulty weld; the pipe was manufactured in 2008.
 On February 10 in Hopkinton, Massachusetts, low temperatures caused freezing rain to do "natural force damage" to a Kinder Morgan Tennessee Gas Pipeline, causing $55,150 worth of property damage.
 On February 17, a suspected electrical arc made a hole in a Marathon Petroleum pipeline in Shively, Kentucky, spilling about 6,700 gallons of jet fuel. More than 2,500 tons of soil were removed to clean up the area.
 On February 25, a 26-inch crude oil pipeline in Navarro County near the Town of Dawson, Texas, failed, spilling about 50 barrels of crude oil. Near the failure, investigation showed that the pipe had lost about 80% of its thickness due to external corrosion. This anomaly was not seen in a 2011 test of this pipeline.
 On March 2, a Kinder Morgan Tennessee Gas Pipeline leaked due to equipment failure, causing $281,890 of property damage in Marshall, Mississippi. The pipe was manufactured in 1944.
 On March 13 a pipeline Patrol pilot identified an oil sheen on a pond near Tehuacana Creek, Texas which was then linked to a leaking 10-inch petroleum products pipeline. About 50 barrels of diesel fuel were spilled.
 On March 20, a pipe owned by Kinder Morgan subsidiary Southern Natural Gas failed in Rolling Fork, Mississippi; the pipe was manufactured in 1930. 
 On March 23, another Southern Natural Gas pipeline failed due to a cracked weld at Augusta, Georgia, causing $311,785 in property damage.
 On April 9, 2 Williams Companies pipelines broke within hours of each other in Marshall County, West Virginia. A 4-inch condensate pipeline broke at 8 pm local time, spilling about 132 barrels of condensate into a creek. Around 10:50 pm local time, a 12-inch gas pipeline ruptured. There was no fire or injuries. Heavy rains were said to be the cause of the failures.
 On April 10, a landowner, in Glen Mills, Pennsylvania, reported a petroleum odor to the Sunoco Control Center. The source of the odor was traced to the Point Breeze to Montello 12" refined products pipeline system. About 1,600 gallons of mixed refined products was leaked. The cause was external corrosion.
 On April 13, a Kinder Morgan / Natural Gas Pipeline Company of America pipeline exploded and burned near Borger, Texas. One home was evacuated, but there were no injuries. The explosion, caused by equipment failure due to environmental cracking, caused $455,000 in property damage. A 60-foot section and a 30-foot section of pipe were ejected and landed about 60 feet and 100 feet away from the failure site, respectively. Metallurgical analysis revealed the cause of the leak was stress corrosion cracking. The pipe was manufactured in 1967. 
 On April 17, a 12-inch natural gas pipeline near Fresno, California operated by Pacific Gas and Electric Company was ruptured by a backhoe. The resulting explosion killed 1 person and injured 12 others.
 On May 15, Kinder Morgan's Tennessee Gas Pipeline leaked in Powell County, Kentucky causing $23,400 in property damage.
 On May 19, a Plains All American Pipeline oil pipeline ruptured near Refugio State Beach, also near Goleta, California, spilling about 124,000 gallons of crude oil. It is referred to as the Refugio Oil Spill.
 On May 31, a 24-inch diameter Texas Eastern natural gas pipeline under the flooding Arkansas River ruptured in Little Rock, Arkansas, damaging a tugboat which "sustained damage on the port side, the smokestack and main deck." The pipeline exploded with enough force to raise geysers of water in the river and also threw cement chunks onto the tugboat‘s deck. The pipeline is owned by Houston-based Spectra Energy. Analysis concluded that high water flow in the river eroded the cover over the pipeline and scoured away the soil support under the pipeline. Once the pipeline was exposed as a free span, rushing water caused vertical oscillation of the pipe, resulting in metal fatigue, cracking the pipe adjacent to a girth weld. The pipe was manufactured in 1952.
 On June 9 in Moorehouse Parish, Louisiana, Kinder Morgan's Tennessee Gas Pipeline equipment failed due to environmental cracking, and leaked, causing $73,395 in property damage. The pipe was manufactured in 1948.
 On June 9, a 24-inch natural gas pipeline ruptured in Lycoming County, Pennsylvania. About 130 individuals were evacuated from their homes. No injuries or damage reported. There was no fire. The cause was stress corrosion cracking. The pipe was installed in 1963. When it failed, it was owned by Transcontinental Gas Pipe Line Company.
 On June 10, Kinder Morgan's El Paso Natural Gas control/relief equipment failed and leaked in Gray County, Texas. Technicians believed debris or trash may have caused the valve to malfunction.
 On June 13, an Energy Transfer Partners 42-inch gas gathering pipeline exploded and burned near Cuero, Texas. Seven homes were evacuated, but there were no injuries. The heat from the flames melted electric lines, cutting off power to 130 homes. Sixteen people were evacuated from homes near the explosion, which caused $500,000 in damage. Energy Transfer Company reported to the Texas Commission on Environmental Quality that as much as 165,732 pounds of volatile organic compounds burned. The Railroad Commission of Texas, in its Pipeline Safety Evaluation, and Inspection Package number 111385, published November 2, 2015, concluded that material failure, as a result of bending stress overload that caused a weld to fail, led to the rupture, explosion, and fire. The pipeline was constructed and installed in 2012. 
 On June 15, Kinder Morgan's Natural Gas Pipeline Co. of America equipment failed adjacent to a weld seam for unknown causes, with $260,555 of property damage in Marshall, Texas (that area's third documented Kinder Morgan leak). The pipe was manufactured in 1967.
 On June 18, in Victoria Texas, Kinder Morgan's Tennessee Gas Pipeline pipe failed due to external corrosion and caused $159,346 in property damage. The pipe was manufactured in 1944.
 On June 22, a truck driver was killed when his rig veered off a highway and broke above ground facilities for a propylene pipeline in Houston, Texas. The highway was closed for several hours while the gas dissipated.
 Four workers were hurt on June 25, when a 4-inch gas pipeline exploded at a gas pipeline facility, near White Deer, Texas. 2 of the workers were critically injured. The cause of the explosion was not immediately known.
 On July 10, a fitting on a 20-inch Plains All American Pipeline crude oil pipeline broke, spilling 4200 gallons of crude oil near Grantfork, Illinois. Much of the crude reached a nearby creek. There were no injuries.
 On July 15, two workers were hurt by an explosion, when a bulldozer hit a 4-inch gas pipeline, at an EQT gas compressor station in Worthington, Pennsylvania. One of the workers later on died from the injuries. While the contractor did use the 811 One call system, the pipeline hit was not a participant of 811. Later this incident was a factor in restricting 811 exemptions.
 On August 3, a Kinder Morgan Tennessee Gas Pipeline 16-inch diameter pipe exploded; the blowout created a 70-foot by 30-ft crater 350 feet from a house and did $191,498 in property damage. Investigation found a longitudinal split in the pipe about 55 feet long along an ERW seam, but the failure was from stress corrosion cracking. The pipe was manufactured in 1947.
 On August 7, a natural gas liquids pipeline in Weld County, Colorado burned after being struck by a third party.
 On August 13, crew working for Colonial Pipeline damaged one of Colonial's lines in Kannapolis, North Carolina, spilling about 6,000 gallons of petroleum product. About 1,000 gallons of product was lost.
 On August 13, a natural gas pipeline in Cypress, Texas, ruptured and leaked while a contract crew worked in the area. The pipeline was owned by Gulfsouth Pipeline. There were no injuries or immediate damage; residents were evacuated.
 On August 17, a 4-inch gas pipeline was hit and ruptured by an excavator, in Winfield, West Virginia. During the shut down of the pipeline, the gas ignited, burning a repair crew worker.
 On August 26, two maintenance divers were injured while working on a pipeline owned by Boardwalk/Gulf South Pipeline Co. 25 miles offshore of Louisiana when the pipeline ruptured and the gas ignited.
On September 5, 2015, Great Lakes Gas Transmission Company had an explosion at a compressor station in Kittson County, Minnesota, about a mile south of the Canadian border. The cause was mechanical failure caused by stress corrosion cracking. The pipe was installed in 1972.
 On September 16, a Shell Oil Company crude oil pipeline leaked near Tracy, California, spilling about 37,800 gallons of crude. An in line inspection report of that pipeline two weeks before had detected no anomalies.
 On September 21, a Colonial Pipeline 32-inch main line leaked in Centreville, Virginia, spilling about 4,000 gallons of gasoline and forcing several nearby businesses to close.
 On October 8, natural gas ignited and exploded at a Williams Companies pipeline facility in Gibson, Louisiana. Four employees were killed and one injured. Cost of the accident was $7,545,044. The cause of the explosion was from procedure not being followed during welding work.
 On November 3, 2015, a leak occurred due to a crack in a girth weld on a Texas Eastern Transmission 24-inch diameter pipeline near Onalaska, Texas. The pipe was manufactured in 1954.
 On November 13, at Bakersfield, California, a heavy equipment operator doing agricultural work struck a 30-inch-diameter PG&E natural gas transmission line, causing a release of gas. The gas ignited and in the resulting explosion one person died and three others were sent to the hospital with second- and third-degree burns. A nearby home and barn were damaged by the fire.
 On November 15, work was being performed on a flow control valve, on a Sunoco 10-inch crude oil pipeline, in Wortham, Texas, when the valve failed, injuring five workers, and spilling some crude oil. It was later determined that the valve was under 400 psi of nitrogen pressure when it was being worked on.
On November 21, Paiute Pipeline personnel were running an inline inspection tool through the 8-inch-diameter Carson lateral pipeline. The leading eye of the tool struck the inside of a long radius 45-degree elbow, puncturing the pipe and resulting in a rupture. Public and private property damage included six vehicles and a landscape retaining wall as a result of the blowing dirt and rocks.
 On November 24, Transco reported a leak on a "dead-leg" section of piping, located on a 20-inch header/regen pipe, within a station in Austin, Pennsylvania. There was no fire or injuries. The facility was shut down for 14 days for repairs and the cost of the damage was approximately $224,528. The cause was internal microbial corrosion.
 On November 30, about 11,000 gallons of gasoline, butane and propane leaked from a pipeline, in eastern Summit County, Utah.
On December 1, personnel from Enterprise Crude Pipeline, LLC (Enterprise Products), discovered a spill at their West Cushing Tank Farm in Cushing, Oklahoma. Approximately 42,000 gallons of crude oil were released within the terminal. A tank line had failed from internal corrosion.

References 

Lists of pipeline accidents in the United States